The Two-Headed Monster is a comical, light purple Muppet monster on the television show Sesame Street, first appearing in season 9, 1978.

History
The Two-Headed Monster, as the name implies, is an example of bicephaly. The right-hand head has purple hair and a black beard, with upturned horns, whereas the left-hand head has black hair and a purple beard, with downturned horns. They have slightly different personalities, with the left-hand head seemingly the more rational and sensible of the two, but also slightly grouchier. Speaking in baby-like gibberish except when emphasizing a word, which is usually enough for them to communicate with others, the monster, in typical sketches, would sound out words in front of a brick wall, or do something else which involves cooperation. They are presumably dicephalic parapagus twins, as their mother made an appearance in one sketch when they sounded the word "mom"; she has a single head and speaks normally. They share a single pair of arms and legs.

Inspiration
The creation of this monster was inspired by performers Jerry Nelson and Richard Hunt playing around on the set one day, saying that they were a monster with two heads. While right-handed performers use their right hands to perform the heads of characters and their left to perform left hands, whoever performs the left half of the monster performs the head with the left hand, and the right hand with their right hand.

Performers
The performers for the Two-Headed Monster are listed in order of the history from the Left Head and the Right Head:

 Richard Hunt and Peter Friedman (ca. 1978)
 Jerry Nelson and Richard Hunt (1978–1991)
 Jerry Nelson and Adam Hunt (Let's Make a Word! PC game, 1995)
 Jerry Nelson and David Rudman (1998–1999)
 Joey Mazzarino and David Rudman (2001–2016)
 Martin P. Robinson and Joey Mazzarino (Episode 4024, 2002)
 Eric Jacobson and David Rudman (2016–present)
 Stephanie D'Abruzzo and David Rudman (Episode 4733, 2017)

Design team
The Two-Headed Monster was designed by Jim Henson and built by Caroly Wilcox.

References

External links
 

Sesame Street Muppet characters
Fictional monsters
Television characters introduced in 1978